Magdaléna Rybáriková was the defending champion, but lost in the third round to Sesil Karatantcheva.

Li Na won the title defeating Maria Sharapova in the final 7–5, 6–1. This was the only title Li won on grass throughout her career.

Seeds
The top eight seeds receive a bye into the second round.

Draw

Finals

Top half

Section 1

Section 2

Bottom half

Section 3

Section 4

References
Main Draw
Qualifying Draw

Aegon Classic - Singles
Aegon Classic - Singles
Singles